In mathematics, a norm is a function from a real or complex vector space to the non-negative real numbers that behaves in certain ways like the distance from the origin: it commutes with scaling, obeys a form of the triangle inequality, and is zero only at the origin. In particular, the Euclidean distance in a Euclidean space is defined by a norm on the associated Euclidean vector space, called the Euclidean norm, the 2-norm, or, sometimes, the magnitude of the vector. This norm can be defined as the square root of the inner product of a vector with itself.

A seminorm satisfies the first two properties of a norm, but may be zero for vectors other than the origin. A vector space with a specified norm is called a normed vector space. In a similar manner, a vector space with a seminorm is called a seminormed vector space.

The term pseudonorm has been used for several related meanings. It may be a synonym of "seminorm". 
A pseudonorm may satisfy the same axioms as a norm, with the equality replaced by an inequality "" in the homogeneity axiom.
It can also refer to a norm that can take infinite values, or to certain functions parametrised by a directed set.

Definition

 Subadditivity/Triangle inequality:  for all 
 Absolute homogeneity:  for all  and all scalars 
 Positive definiteness/: for all  if  then 
 Because property (2.) implies  some authors replace property (3.) with the equivalent condition: for every   if and only if 

However, there exist seminorms that are not norms. Properties (1.) and (2.) imply that if  is a norm (or more generally, a seminorm) then  and that  also has the following property:

Non-negativity:  for all 

Some authors include non-negativity as part of the definition of "norm", although this is not necessary.

Equivalent norms

The relation " is equivalent to " is reflexive, symmetric ( implies ), and transitive and thus defines an equivalence relation on the set of all norms on  

Notation

If a norm  is given on a vector space  then the norm of a vector  is usually denoted by enclosing it within double vertical lines:   Such notation is also sometimes used if  is only a seminorm.  For the length of a vector in Euclidean space (which is an example of a norm, as explained below), the notation  with single vertical lines is also widespread.

Examples

Absolute-value norm

The absolute value

is a norm on the one-dimensional vector spaces formed by the real or complex numbers.

This isomorphism is given by sending  to a vector of norm  which exists since such a vector is obtained by multiplying any non-zero vector by the inverse of its norm.

Euclidean norm

On the -dimensional Euclidean space  the intuitive notion of length of the vector  is captured by the formula

This is the Euclidean norm, which gives the ordinary distance from the origin to the point X—a consequence of the Pythagorean theorem. 
This operation may also be referred to as "SRSS", which is an acronym for the square root of the sum of squares.

The Euclidean norm is by far the most commonly used norm on  but there are other norms on this vector space as will be shown below. 
However, all these norms are equivalent in the sense that they all define the same topology.

The inner product of two vectors of a Euclidean vector space is the dot product of their coordinate vectors over an orthonormal basis. 
Hence, the Euclidean norm can be written in a coordinate-free way as

The Euclidean norm is also called the  norm,  norm, 2-norm, or square norm; see  space. 
It defines a distance function called the Euclidean length,  distance, or  distance.

The set of vectors in  whose Euclidean norm is a given positive constant forms an -sphere.

Euclidean norm of complex numbers

The Euclidean norm of a complex number is the absolute value (also called the modulus) of it, if the complex plane is identified with the Euclidean plane  This identification of the complex number  as a vector in the Euclidean plane, makes the quantity  (as first suggested by Euler) the Euclidean norm associated with the complex number.

Quaternions and octonions

There are exactly four Euclidean Hurwitz algebras over the real numbers. These are the real numbers  the complex numbers  the quaternions  and lastly the octonions  where the dimensions of these spaces over the real numbers are  respectively. 

for every quaternion  in  This is the same as the Euclidean norm on  considered as the vector space  Similarly, the canonical norm on the octonions is just the Euclidean norm on

Finite-dimensional complex normed spaces

On an -dimensional complex space  the most common norm is

In this case, the norm can be expressed as the square root of the inner product of the vector and itself:

where  is represented as a column vector  and  denotes its conjugate transpose.

This formula is valid for any inner product space, including Euclidean and complex spaces.  For complex spaces, the inner product is equivalent to the complex dot product. Hence the formula in this case can also be written using the following notation:

Taxicab norm or Manhattan norm

The name relates to the distance a taxi has to drive in a rectangular street grid (like that of the New York borough of Manhattan) to get from the origin to the point 

The set of vectors whose 1-norm is a given constant forms the surface of a cross polytope of dimension equivalent to that of the norm minus 1. 
The Taxicab norm is also called the  norm. The distance derived from this norm is called the Manhattan distance or  distance.

The 1-norm is simply the sum of the absolute values of the columns.

In contrast,

is not a norm because it may yield negative results.

p-norm

Let  be a real number. 
The -norm (also called -norm) of vector  is

For  we get the taxicab norm, for  we get the Euclidean norm, and as  approaches  the -norm approaches the infinity norm or maximum norm:

The -norm is related to the generalized mean or power mean.

For  the -norm is even induced by a canonical inner product  meaning that  for all vectors  This inner product can be expressed in terms of the norm by using the polarization identity. 
On  this inner product is the  defined by

while for the space  associated with a measure space  which consists of all square-integrable functions, this inner product is 

This definition is still of some interest for  but the resulting function does not define a norm, because it violates the triangle inequality. 
What is true for this case of  even in the measurable analog, is that the corresponding  class is a vector space, and it is also true that the function

(without th root) defines a distance that makes  into a complete metric topological vector space. These spaces are of great interest in functional analysis, probability theory and harmonic analysis.
However, aside from trivial cases, this topological vector space is not locally convex, and has no continuous non-zero linear forms. Thus the topological dual space contains only the zero functional.

The partial derivative of the -norm is given by

The derivative with respect to  therefore, is

For the special case of  this becomes

or

Maximum norm (special case of: infinity norm, uniform norm, or supremum norm)

If  is some vector such that  then:

The set of vectors whose infinity norm is a given constant,  forms the surface of a hypercube with edge length

Zero norm

In probability and functional analysis, the zero norm induces a complete metric topology for the space of measurable functions and for the F-space of sequences with F–norm  
Here we mean by F-norm some real-valued function  on an F-space with distance  such that  The F-norm described above is not a norm in the usual sense because it lacks the required homogeneity property.

Hamming distance of a vector from zero

In metric geometry, the discrete metric takes the value one for distinct points and zero otherwise. When applied coordinate-wise to the elements of a vector space, the discrete distance defines the Hamming distance, which is important in coding and information theory. 
In the field of real or complex numbers, the distance of the discrete metric from zero is not homogeneous in the non-zero point; indeed, the distance from zero remains one as its non-zero argument approaches zero. 
However, the discrete distance of a number from zero does satisfy the other properties of a norm, namely the triangle inequality and positive definiteness. 
When applied component-wise to vectors, the discrete distance from zero behaves like a non-homogeneous "norm", which counts the number of non-zero components in its vector argument; again, this non-homogeneous "norm" is discontinuous.

In signal processing and statistics, David Donoho referred to the zero "norm" with quotation marks. 
When this "norm" is localized to a bounded set, it is the limit of -norms as  approaches 0. 
Of course, the zero "norm" is not truly a norm, because it is not positive homogeneous. 
Indeed, it is not even an F-norm in the sense described above, since it is discontinuous, jointly and severally, with respect to the scalar argument in scalar–vector multiplication and with respect to its vector argument. 
Abusing terminology, some engineers omit Donoho's quotation marks and inappropriately call the number-of-non-zeros function the  norm, echoing the notation for the Lebesgue space of measurable functions.

Infinite dimensions

for complex-valued sequences and functions on  respectively, which can be further generalized (see Haar measure).

Any inner product induces in a natural way the norm 

Other examples of infinite-dimensional normed vector spaces can be found in the Banach space article.

Composite norms

Other norms on  can be constructed by combining the above; for example

is a norm on 

For any norm and any injective linear transformation  we can define a new norm of  equal to

In 2D, with  a rotation by 45° and a suitable scaling, this changes the taxicab norm into the maximum norm. Each  applied to the taxicab norm, up to inversion and interchanging of axes, gives a different unit ball: a parallelogram of a particular shape, size, and orientation.

In 3D, this is similar but different for the 1-norm (octahedrons) and the maximum norm (prisms with parallelogram base).

There are examples of norms that are not defined by "entrywise" formulas.

All the above formulas also yield norms on  without modification.

There are also norms on spaces of matrices (with real or complex entries), the so-called matrix norms.

In abstract algebra

However, the -th root of the norm (assuming that concept makes sense) is a norm.

Composition algebras

The concept of norm  in composition algebras does  share the usual properties of a norm as it may be negative or zero for  A composition algebra  consists of an algebra over a field  an involution  and a quadratic form  called the "norm".

In those cases the norm is a definite quadratic form. In other composition algebras the norm is an isotropic quadratic form.

Properties

For any norm  on a vector space  the reverse triangle inequality holds: 

For the   norms, we have Hölder's inequality

A special case of this is the Cauchy–Schwarz inequality:

Every norm is a seminorm and thus satisfies all properties of the latter. In turn, every seminorm is a sublinear function and thus satisfies all properties of the latter. In particular, every norm is a convex function.

Equivalence

The concept of unit circle (the set of all vectors of norm 1) is different in different norms: for the 1-norm, the unit circle is a square, for the 2-norm (Euclidean norm), it is the well-known unit circle, while for the infinity norm, it is a different square. For any -norm, it is a superellipse with congruent axes (see the accompanying illustration).

In terms of the vector space, the seminorm defines a topology on the space, and this is a Hausdorff topology precisely when the seminorm can distinguish between distinct vectors, which is again equivalent to the seminorm being a norm. The topology thus defined (by either a norm or a seminorm) can be understood either in terms of sequences or open sets. A sequence of vectors  is said to converge in norm to  if  as  Equivalently, the topology consists of all sets that can be represented as a union of open balls. If  is a normed space then 

For instance, if  on  then

In particular,

That is, 

If the vector space is a finite-dimensional real or complex one, all norms are equivalent. On the other hand, in the case of infinite-dimensional vector spaces, not all norms are equivalent.

Equivalent norms define the same notions of continuity and convergence and for many purposes do not need to be distinguished. To be more precise the uniform structure defined by equivalent norms on the vector space is uniformly isomorphic.

Classification of seminorms: absolutely convex absorbing sets

All seminorms on a vector space  can be classified in terms of absolutely convex absorbing subsets  of  To each such subset corresponds a seminorm  called the gauge of  defined as

where  is the infimum, with the property that

Conversely:

Any locally convex topological vector space has a local basis consisting of absolutely convex sets. A common method to construct such a basis is to use a family  of seminorms  that separates points: the collection of all finite intersections of sets  turns the space into a locally convex topological vector space so that every p is continuous.

Such a method is used to design weak and weak* topologies.

norm case:

The converse is due to Andrey Kolmogorov: any locally convex and locally bounded topological vector space is normable. Precisely:
If  is an absolutely convex bounded neighbourhood of 0, the gauge  (so that  is a norm.

See also

References

Bibliography

  
   
  
   
   
 

Functional analysis
Linear algebra